Angel Pavement is a British television drama series which first aired on BBC 1 between 27 December 1957 and 17 January 1958. It is an adaptation of the 1930 novel Angel Pavement by J.B. Priestley. It follows the fortunes of a small London-based company just before the outbreak of the Great Depression.

A second television adaptation of the novel was produced by the BBC in 1967. Both adaptations are considered completely lost.

Main cast
Maurice Denham as Mr. Smeeth
Sydney Tafler as Mr. Golspie
Catherine Feller as Lena Golspie
Margaret Tyzack as Miss Matfield
Anthony Sharp as Mr. Dersingham
Alec McCowen as Turgis
Maureen Pryor as Mrs. Smeeth
Robert Vahey as George Smeeth
 Irene Handl as  Mrs. Mitty
Robert Scroggins as Stanley Poole
 Edwina Rendell as  Poppy Sellars
Ursula Jenkins as Edna Smeeth
 Hilda Barry as Mrs. Pelumpton
 Colin Douglas as Fred Mitty
 Thomas Gallagher as Captain
 Nan Marriott-Watson as Charwoman
 Derek Nimmo as Young Man

References

Bibliography
Ellen Baskin. Serials on British Television, 1950-1994. Scolar Press, 1996.

External links
 

BBC television dramas
1957 British television series debuts
1958 British television series endings
English-language television shows
Television shows based on British novels